Liu Pengli, Prince of Jidong, was a 2nd-century BC Han prince.

Family
Liu Pengli was the grandson of Emperor Wen (r. 180-157 BCE) and the nephew of Emperor Jing (r. 157-141 BCE). Liu Pengli was the third son of Liu Wu, Prince of Liang, and the nephew of the Emperor Jing. Liu Wu's other sons included (in order) Liu Mai, Liu Ming, Liu Ding, and Liu Bushi.

Biography
Liu was Prince of Jidong in the sixth year of the middle era of the Emperor Jing of Han (144 BC), the year of his father, Liu Wu's banishment from the capital and death. The empress dowager Xiaowen grieved greatly for her younger son and, to placate her (and weaken the powerful fief of Liang), Emperor Jing divided Liang in five and granted a part to each of Liu Wu's sons.

Sima Qian's Records of the Grand Historian relates that, "At the age of twenty-nine, he was arrogant and cruel and would go out on marauding expeditions with tens of slaves or young men who were in hiding from the law, murdering people and seizing their belongings for sheer sport. Apparently, Liu Pengli recruited 20-30 individuals with similar predilections to accompany him in the search for victims to rob and kill. Confirmed victims exceeded 100, and these murders were known across the kingdom, so people were afraid of leaving their homes at night. Eventually, the son of one of his victims made an accusation to the Emperor, and the officials of the court requested that Liu Pengli be executed; however, the Emperor could not bear to have his own nephew killed, and Liu Pengli was made a commoner and banished to the county of Shangyong (now Zhushan in Hubei Province). In 116 BC, his sovereignty was abolished and his land was reclaimed by the Emperor Jing".

See also
List of serial killers by country

References

2nd-century BC people
Chinese serial killers
Han dynasty imperial princes
Male serial killers